Dayr al-Qassi or Deir el-Qasi, was a Palestinian Arab village located 26 km northeast of the city of Acre, which was  depopulated during 1948 Arab-Israeli war.

Geography
The village was located 26 km northeast of the city of Acre, on a rocky hill about 5 km south of the Lebanese border. It was linked by a paved road to  Fassuta  in the north and Tarshiha in the southwest.  The road divided the town into an eastern and one western quarter, or haras, the eastern quarter being higher up.

History
The first part of the village name, Dayr ("monastery") suggest that the village might have had a monastery and a Christian population. However, in modern times the population was Muslim. According to the residents of the village, ancient artifacts from the Canaanite, Israelite and Roman period were unearthed in the Ottoman and British Mandate period.

Ceramics from the late Roman and the Byzantine eras have been found here.

In the Crusader era it was known as Cassie, and in 1183 it was noted that  Godfrey de Tor sold  the land of the village  to Joscelin III. In 1220  Jocelyn III's daughter Beatrix de Courtenay and her husband Otto von Botenlauben, Count of Henneberg,  sold  their land, including Cassie and the nearby Roeis (Khirbet Tell ‘er-Ruwesah/Tel Rosh), to the Teutonic Knights.

Remains from the  Mamluk era have been found in the area.

Ottoman era
Dayr al-Qassi was incorporated into the Ottoman Empire in 1517 and it belonged to the  nahiya (subdistrict)  of Jira, part of the Safad Sanjak (District of Safed). In the 1596 tax records Dayr al-Qassi had a population of 24 Muslim household; an estimated 132 persons. The villagers paid a fixed tax-rated of 25% on a number of crops, including wheat and barley, as well as on goats and beehives; a total of 345 akçe.

In the early 18th century, Dayr al-Qassi was a fortified village controlled by a local sheikh (chief) named Abd al-Khaliq Salih. In 1740, Sheikh Zahir al-Umar, an Arab mutasallim (tax collector) from the al-Zayadina clan whose strength was growing throughout the Galilee, struggled to gain control of Dayr al-Qassi. Later that year, he made the village part of his domain by marrying Sheikh Salih's daughter, thereby sealing an alliance with the latter's clan. In late 1767, Zahir's son Ali of Safad requested control of Dayr al-Qassi from his father after his request for Dayr Hanna was rejected. Zahir refused and the two entered into an armed conflict, which Zahir won. Nonetheless, Zahir pardoned Ali and ultimately ceded the village to him.

In 1838, Deir el-Kasy was noted as a Muslim village in the El Jebel district, located west of  Safad.

Victor Guérin visited Dayr al-Qassi in 1875, and he estimated that the village had 350 Muslim inhabitants. In 1881, Dayr al-Qassi was described in the  PEF's Survey of Western Palestine (SWP) as being situated on a ridge, encircled by fig trees, olive trees and arable land. It then had a population of about 200.

A population list from about 1887 showed  Deir el Kasy to have  about 945 inhabitants, all Muslims.

British Mandate period

At the time of the 1922 census of Palestine conducted by the  British Mandate, Dair Wal Qasi  had a population of  663,  all Muslims, increasing in  the 1931 census, when Deir el Qasi had a population of 865, still all Muslims, living in a total of 169 houses.

Later, Dayr al-Qassi was mostly Muslim but had a large Palestinian Christian minority. According to the    1945 census  it had 1,250 inhabitants; 370 Christians and 880 Muslims.  Together with the two villages of Fassuta (existent) and al-Mansura, the  population was 2,300 and their  total land area was 34,011 dunums.  1,607 dunams were plantations and irrigable land, 6,475 used for cereals, while 247  dunams were built-up (urban) land.

Israel
During the 1948 Arab-Israeli War Dayr al-Qassi was defended by the Arab Liberation Army but the village was captured by the Israeli Army during its offensive Operation Hiram on October 30, 1948. The village's residents were expelled on 27 May 1949 and most migrated north into Lebanon. By June, 1949, it was noted that the whole northern area had been "Judaised", including Tarshiha, Suhmata, Dayr al-Qassi,  Tarbikha,  Meiron,  Al-Sammu'i, Safsaf and Al-Ras al-Ahmar.

Elkosh, established in 1949, occupies part of the village site. Netu'a, founded in 1966, Mattat, founded in 1979 and Abirim, founded in 1980, are also on village land. Netu'a is near the neighboring village of al-Mansura.

The Palestinian historian, Walid Khalidi, described the remaining structures on the village land in 1992: "A few stone houses still are used as residences or warehouses by the inhabitants of Elqosh. The debris of destroyed houses is strewn over the site. The school building stands deserted. Fig and olive trees and cactuses grow on the site." In 2004, some of the remains of the village were removed by mechanical equipment during excavations by the Israel Antiquities Authority.

In 2000, a book about the village history was published by Ibrahim Khalil Uthman.

Notable people
Nabil Marouf, Palestinian Ambassador to Canada, born in Dayr al-Qassi in 1946.

See also
Depopulated Palestinian locations in Israel

Notes

Bibliography

External links
 Palestine Remembered - Dayr al-Qasi
  Dayr al-Qasi,  Zochrot
Survey of Western Palestine, Map 4:   IAA, Wikimedia commons 
Dayr Al-Qasi from the Khalil Sakakini Cultural Center
 Der al-Qasi, from Dr. Moslih Kanaaneh

District of Acre
Arab villages depopulated after the 1948 Arab–Israeli War
Former populated places in Israel
1948 disestablishments in Israel